Taffs Well railway station is a railway station serving the village of Taff's Well, Rhondda Cynon Taf, Wales, as well as neighbouring Gwaelod-y-Garth, Cardiff. It is located on the Merthyr Line and the Rhondda Line. Passenger services are provided by Transport for Wales.

The station was first opened on this site by the Taff Vale Railway in 1863.

Junctions
The Rhymney line, which diverged at Walnut Tree Junction just south of the station was known locally as the Big Hill, due to its severe gradients (as steep as 1 in 48) for northbound trains. Increasing congestion on the 'main line' south of here led to the Rhymney company opening its own direct line via  in 1871, but after the 1923 Grouping the Great Western Railway (and later BR) made extensive use of the line for its coal trains from the many collieries in the Rhymney Valley to the marshalling yards at Radyr. Both this line and the Nantgarw colliery spur are now closed and lifted - the last train down the Big Hill ran in June 1982, whilst the latter branch was finally taken out of use in 1991 after the demise of the colliery and nearby coking works some five years earlier.

After the dismantling of the Viaduct, only one pier remains. This was used to display a goodwill message for Elizabeth II Silver and Golden Jubilee. These are still visible from the train approaching the station from the south.

Services 

The first City Line service of the day starts back from Taffs Well at 0653 to Coryton (with a 0704 departure from Radyr). There is no service in the opposite direction.

A reduced service operates in the evenings (3 trains per hour each way) and on Sundays.

References

External links 

Railway stations in Rhondda Cynon Taf
DfT Category F2 stations
Former Taff Vale Railway stations
Railway stations in Great Britain opened in 1840
Railway stations served by Transport for Wales Rail